Christopher Gregory Makin (born 8 May 1973) is an English retired professional footballer. He spent the final part of his career at Southampton, but is perhaps most famous for his spell at Sunderland. He played as a defender.

His previous clubs are Oldham Athletic, Olympique de Marseille, Sunderland, Ipswich Town, Leicester City, Wigan Athletic, Derby County, Reading and Southampton.

On 23 April 2008, on advice from his doctor, Makin retired from football after failing to overcome a hip injury which had prevented him playing since September 2007.

Career statistics

Honours
Sunderland
Football League First Division: 1998–99

Reading
Football League Championship: 2005–06

Individual
Sunderland Solid Gold XI

References

External links
Chris Makin profile at saintsfc.co.uk

Photos and stats at sporting-heroes.net

1973 births
Living people
Association football defenders
Derby County F.C. players
England under-21 international footballers
English expatriate footballers
English Football League players
English footballers
Expatriate footballers in France
Footballers from St Helens, Merseyside
Ipswich Town F.C. players
Leicester City F.C. players
Ligue 1 players
Oldham Athletic A.F.C. players
Olympique de Marseille players
Premier League players
Reading F.C. players
Southampton F.C. players
Sunderland A.F.C. players
Wigan Athletic F.C. players